Jenny Creek is a stream in the U.S. states of California and Oregon. It empties into Iron Gate Reservoir.

Jenny Creek received its name in the 1850s when a jenny mule drowned in its waters.

References

Rivers of California
Rivers of Siskiyou County, California
Rivers of Oregon
Rivers of Jackson County, Oregon
Wild and Scenic Rivers of the United States